The men's sprint cycling event at the 1984 Summer Olympics took place from 31 July to 3 August and was one of eight cycling events at the 1984 Olympics. Once again, the limit on cyclists per nation was raised to 2 (it had been 1 from 1928 to 1956, 2 from 1960 to 1972, and 1 again in 1976 and 1980). The event was won by Mark Gorski of the United States, the nation's first victory in the men's sprint and first medal in the event since John Henry Lake took bronze in 1900. The final was all-American, as Nelson Vails took silver, becoming the first Olympic cycling medalist of African descent. Japan earned its first medal in the men's sprint with Tsutomu Sakamoto's bronze. France's five-Games podium streak in the event ended.

Background
This was the 18th appearance of the event, which has been held at every Summer Olympics except 1904 and 1912. The two returning quarterfinalists from 1980 were sixth-place finisher Heinz Isler of Switzerland and seventh-place finisher Kenrick Tucker of Australia. The Soviet-led boycott was particularly disruptive in this event, with the East German team dominant at the time. In particular, Lutz Heßlich was the best sprinter in the world for most of the 1980s and would have had a strong opportunity for three straight gold medals if not for the boycott; he had won the 1979 and 1983 World Championships and the 1980 Olympic gold, and would go on to win the 1985 and 1987 World Championships and the 1988 Olympic gold. The 1981 and 1982 World Champion and 1980 Olympic bronze medalist, Soviet Sergei Kopylov, was also kept out due to the boycott. Of the nations that were competing in Los Angeles, the host Americans were favored. Mark Gorski had beaten Kopylov multiple times in 1983. Nelson Vails was also a top contender.

The Cayman Islands and Chinese Taipei each made their debut in the men's sprint. France made its 18th appearance, the only nation to have competed at every appearance of the event.

Competition format
This sprint competition involved a series of head-to-head matches. With a larger field due to allowing two cyclists per nation instead of just one, the competition ballooned to 11 rounds: six main rounds and three repechages, two of which were two-round repechages.

 Round 1: The 34 entrants were divided into 12 heats, most with 3 cyclists but a few with 2 (including one heat that was reduced to 2 by a withdrawal). The winner of each heat advanced directly to round 2 (12 cyclists), while all other cyclists who competed were sent to the first repechage semifinals (21 cyclists).
 First repechage semifinals: The 21 cyclists were divided into 8 heats, each with 2 or 3 cyclists. The winner of each heat advanced to round 2 (8 cyclists), while the remaining cyclists went to the first repechage finals (13 cyclists).
 First repechage finals: The 13 cyclists were divided into 4 heats, with 3 or 4 cyclists each. The winner of each heat advanced to round 2 (4 cyclists), with all others eliminated (9 cyclists).
 Round 2: The 24 cyclists were divided into 12 heats of 2 cyclists each. The winner of each heat advanced to the 1/8 finals (12 cyclists) while losers went to the second repechage (12 cyclists).
 Second repechage: The 12 cyclists competed in 6 heats of 2 cyclists. Winners advanced to the 1/8 finals, losers were eliminated.
 1/8 finals: The 18 remaining cyclists competed in a 1/8 finals round. There were 6 heats in this round, with 3 cyclists in each. The top cyclist in each heat advanced to the quarterfinals (6 cyclists), while the remaining two in each heat went to the third repechage semifinals (12 cyclists).
 Third repechage semifinals: This round featured 4 heats, with 3 cyclists each. The winner of each heat advanced to the third repechage finals (4 cyclists); the others were eliminated (8 cyclists).
 Third repechage finals: The 4 cyclists advancing to this round were divided into 2 heats of 2 cyclists each. The winners advanced to the quarterfinals while the losers were eliminated.
 Quarterfinals: Beginning with the quarterfinals, all matches were one-on-one competitions and were held in best-of-three format. There were 4 quarterfinals, with the winner of each advancing to the semifinals and the loser going to the fifth-eighth classification race.
 Semifinals: The two semifinals provided for advancement to the gold medal final for winners and to the bronze medal final for losers.
 Finals: Both a gold medal final and a bronze medal final were held, as well as a classification final for fifth through eighth places for quarterfinal losers.

Records
The records for the sprint are 200 metre flying time trial records, kept for the qualifying round in later Games as well as for the finish of races.

No new world or Olympic records were set during the competition.

Schedule
All times are Pacific Daylight Time (UTC-7)

Results

Round 1

Round 1 heat 1

Round 1 heat 2

Round 1 heat 3

Round 1 heat 4

Round 1 heat 5

Round 1 heat 6

Round 1 heat 7

Round 1 heat 8

Round 1 heat 9

Round 1 heat 10

Round 1 heat 11

Round 1 heat 12

First repêchage semifinals

First repechage semifinal 1

First repechage semifinal 2

First repechage semifinal 3

First repechage semifinal 4

First repechage semifinal 5

First repechage semifinal 6

First repechage semifinal 7

First repechage semifinal 8

First repêchage finals

First repechage final 1

First repechage final 2

First repechage final 3

First repechage final 4

Round 2

Round 2 heat 1

Round 2 heat 2

Round 2 heat 3

Round 2 heat 4

Round 2 heat 5

Round 2 heat 6

Round 2 heat 7

Round 2 heat 8

Round 2 heat 9

Round 2 heat 10

Round 2 heat 11

Round 2 heat 12

Second repêchage

Second repechage heat 1

Second repechage heat 2

Second repechage heat 3

Second repechage heat 4

Second repechage heat 5

Second repechage heat 6

1/8 finals

1/8 final 1

1/8 final 2
The second resulted in an appeal that determined all three riders were at fault. Ceci was relegated to the repechage, while Alexandre and Lee re-ran the heat.

Original

Re-run

1/8 final 3

1/8 final 4

1/8 final 5

1/8 final 6

Third repêchage semifinals

Third repechage semifinal 1

Third repechage semifinal 2

Third repechage semifinal 3

Third repechage semifinal 4

Third repêchage finals

Third repechage final 1

Third repechage final 2

Quarterfinals

Quarterfinal 1

Quarterfinal 2

Quarterfinal 3

Quarterfinal 4

Semifinals

Semifinal 1

Semifinal 2

Finals

Classification 5–8

Bronze medal match

Final

References

Cycling at the 1984 Summer Olympics
Cycling at the Summer Olympics – Men's sprint
Track cycling at the 1984 Summer Olympics